Kumsi Sidisow is an Indian politician of the Bharatiya Janata Party from Arunachal Pradesh.
He was elected as the Member of Legislative Assembly of Arunachal Pradesh from the 6-Thrizino-Buragaon (ST) in 2014 assembly election.

References

Arunachal Pradesh MLAs 2019–2024
Indian National Congress politicians
Living people
Year of birth missing (living people)
Place of birth missing (living people)
People from West Kameng district
People's Party of Arunachal politicians
Arunachal Pradesh MLAs 2014–2019